The liver plays the major role in producing proteins that are secreted into the blood, including major plasma proteins, factors in hemostasis and fibrinolysis, carrier proteins, hormones, prohormones and apolipoprotein:

Major plasma proteins
All plasma proteins except Gamma-globulins are synthesised in the liver.
Human serum albumin, osmolyte and carrier protein
α-fetoprotein, the fetal counterpart of serum albumin 
Soluble plasma fibronectin, forming a blood clot that stops bleeding
C-reactive protein, opsonin on microbes, acute phase protein
Various other globulins

Factors in hemostasis and fibrinolysis
Stimulators of coagulation:
All factors in the coagulation cascade. 
While the endothelium does produce some factor VIII, the majority of factor VIII is produced in the liver.
Inhibitors of coagulation: Inactivate an enormous variety of proteinases
α2-macroglobulin
α1-antitrypsin
Antithrombin III
Protein S
Protein C
Fibrinolysis: Breakdown of fibrin clots
Plasminogen
Inhibitors of fibrinolysis
α2-antiplasmin
Complement components C1-9, complement component 3 (C3)

Carrier proteins
Albumin, carries thyroid hormones and other hormones, particularly fat soluble ones,  fatty acids to the liver, unconjugated bilirubin, many drugs and Ca2+
Ceruloplasmin, carries copper
Transcortin, carries cortisol, aldosterone and progesterone
Haptoglobin, carries free hemoglobin released from erythrocytes
Hemopexin, carries free heme released from hemoglobin
IGF binding protein, carries insulin-like growth factor 1
Major urinary proteins, carries pheromones in rodents
Retinol binding protein, carries retinol
Sex hormone-binding globulin, carries sex hormones, specifically testosterone and estradiol
Thyroxine-binding globulin, carries the thyroid hormones thyroxine (T4) and 3,5,3’-triiodothyronine (T3)
Transthyretin, carries the thyroid hormone thyroxine (T4)
Transferrin, carries iron ions in the ferric form (Fe3+)
Vitamin D-binding protein, carries vitamin D

Hormones 
FGF21, a protein hormone that induces mitochondrial oxidation of fatty acids, hepatic gluconeogenesis, and ketogenesis in response to fasting.
Hepcidin, a peptide hormone that regulates iron homeostasis.
Insulin-like growth factor 1, a polypeptide protein hormone which plays an important role in childhood growth and continues to have anabolic effects in adults
Thrombopoietin, a glycoprotein hormone that regulates the production of platelets by the bone marrow

Prohormones
Angiotensinogen, when converted to angiotensin causes vasoconstriction and release of aldosterone, in effect increasing blood pressure

Apolipoproteins
Almost all apolipoprotein, except apo B48 (produced by intestine)

References
General reference for the list of included substances (but not their functions):
Table 45-4 in: 

Other:

Liver anatomy